Bang Zoom! Entertainment is an audio post-production studio with its headquarters in Burbank, California, in Greater Los Angeles. It has worked on anime, video games, television series, feature films, and original animation projects.

Their work for Lost in Oz won Bang Zoom! two Daytime Emmy Awards for Outstanding Sound Mixing and Outstanding Sound Editing.

Adventures in Voice Acting 

Bang Zoom! Entertainment released a series of interviews with "close to 100 [voice] actors, producers, and casting directors" on DVD, titled Adventures in Voice Acting: Anime, Games and Animation. Many of the interviews took place on set and in their respective studios.

Production list

Anime 

 86 (A-1 Pictures/Crunchyroll)
 A Lull in the Sea (NIS America)
 A.I.C.O. -Incarnation- (Bones/Netflix; 2nd release)
 Accel World (Viz Media)
 Ai Yori Aoshi (Funimation)
 Aika R-16: Virgin Mission (Bandai Entertainment)
 Aldnoah.Zero (Aniplex of America)
 Anohana (Aniplex of America)
 Apocalypse Zero (Media Blasters)
 Arc the Lad (ADV Films)
 Argento Soma (Bandai Entertainment -> Sentai Filmworks)
 Ascendance of a Bookworm (Seasons 1-2: Sentai Filmworks, Season 3: Crunchyroll) (Crunchyroll/Sentai Filmworks)
 The Asterisk War (Aniplex of America)
 B – The Beginning (Production I.G/Netflix)
 Babel II - Beyond Infinity (Media Blasters)
 Berserk (Crunchyroll)
 Beyblade Burst Turbo (Sunrights/Hasbro)
 Blade of the Immortal (Media Blasters)
 Blood Lad (Viz Media)
 Blue Exorcist (Aniplex of America)
 Bludgeoning Angel Dokuro-chan (Media Blasters)
 Bubble (WIT Studio/Netflix)
 Burn-Up Scramble (Geneon)
 Carole & Tuesday (Bones/Netflix/Sentai Filmworks)
 Cells at Work! (Aniplex of America)
 Cells at Work! Code Black (Aniplex of America)
 Charlotte (Aniplex of America)
 Chobits (Funimation)
 Coppelion (Viz Media)
 Cosmo Warrior Zero (Media Blasters)
 Cyborg 009: Call of Justice (Production I.G/Ishimori Productions/Netflix)
 D4DJ (Bushiroad/Sentai Filmworks)
 Demon Slayer: Kimetsu no Yaiba (Crunchyroll/Aniplex of America)
 Detective Conan: Zero's Tea Time (TMS Entertainment/Netflix)
 Don't Toy with Me, Miss Nagatoro (Telecom Animation Film/Crunchyroll)
 Doraemon (Fujiko Productions/Viz Media)
 Dragon Ball Super (Toei Animation/Turner Asia)
 Dragon's Dogma (Sublimation/Netflix)
 Durarara!! (Aniplex of America)
 Edens Zero (J.C.Staff/Netflix)
 Engage Kiss (Aniplex of America)
 Eureka Seven (Season 1 only) (Bandai Entertainment -> Funimation)
 Erased (Aniplex of America)
 éX-Driver (OAV's: Media Blasters, Danger Zone & Movie: Geneon)
 Fafner in the Azure (Season 1 only) (Funimation)
 The Familiar of Zero (Season 1 only) (Sentai Filmworks)
 Fate/Apocrypha (Imagica/Netflix)
 Fate/Extra Last Encore (Shaft/Netflix)
 Fate/stay night (Sentai Filmworks)
 Fate/stay night: Unlimited Blade Works (Aniplex of America)
 Fate/Zero (Aniplex of America)
 Figure 17 (Media Blasters)
 FLAG (Bandai Entertainment)
 Fly Me to the Moon (Crunchyroll/Anime Limited)
 Gad Guard (Funimation)
 Gankutsuou: The Count of Monte Cristo (Funimation)
 Gargantia on the Verdurous Planet (Viz Media)
 Gestalt (Media Blasters)
 Ghost in the Shell: SAC 2045 (Production I.G/Netflix)
 Ghost Slayers Ayashi (Bandai Entertainment)
 God Eater (Aniplex of America)
 Granblue Fantasy The Animation (Season 1 only) (Aniplex of America)
 Grenadier (Media Blasters)
 Ground Defense Force! Mao-chan (Geneon)
 Gun Frontier (Media Blasters)
 Gundam Build Divers (Sunrise)
 Gundam Build Divers Re:Rise (Sunrise)
 Gungrave (Funimation)
 Gurren Lagann (Bandai Entertainment -> Aniplex of America)
 Hanaukyo Maid Team: La Verite (Sentai Filmworks)
 Haré+Guu (AnimeNation/AN Entertainment)
 Heat Guy J (Funimation)
 Here Is Greenwood (Media Blasters)
 Hero Mask (Studio Pierrot/Netflix)
 Heroes: Legend of the Battle Disks (MarVista Entertainment)
 Hunter × Hunter (2011) (Viz Media) 
 I'll/CKBC (Media Blasters)
 Idol Project (Media Blasters)
 IGPX (Discotek Media)
 In/Spectre (Crunchyroll/Viz Media)
 Ingress (Craftar/Netflix/Sentai Filmworks)
 The Irregular at Magic High School (Aniplex of America)
 JoJo's Bizarre Adventure (Warner Bros. Entertainment -> Viz Media)
 JoJo's Bizarre Adventure: Stardust Crusaders (Viz Media)
 JoJo's Bizarre Adventure: Diamond Is Unbreakable (Viz Media)
 JoJo's Bizarre Adventure: Golden Wind (Viz Media)
 JoJo's Bizarre Adventure: Stone Ocean (David Production/Netflix)
 Jungle de Ikou! (Media Blasters)
 K-On! (Bandai Entertainment -> Sentai Filmworks)
 Kakegurui (MAPPA/BTI Studios/Netflix) 
 Kannazuki no Miko (Sentai Filmworks)
 Karas (Manga Entertainment)
 Katsugeki/Touken Ranbu (Aniplex of America)
 Kill la Kill (Aniplex of America)
 KonoSuba (Crunchyroll/Discotek Media)
 Kurogane Communication (Media Blasters)
 Kuroko's Basketball (Production I.G/Netflix, credited as Unforeseen Productions)
 Lagrange: The Flower of Rin-ne (Viz Media)
 Last Exile (Season 1 only) (Funimation)
 Love Hina (OAV's only) (Bandai Entertainment)
 Love Live! School Idol Project (NIS America)
 Lucky ☆ Star (Bandai Entertainment -> Funimation)
 Lunar Legend Tsukihime (Sentai Filmworks)
 Lycoris Recoil (Aniplex of America)
 Magi: The Labyrinth of Magic (Aniplex of America)
 Magi: Adventure of Sinbad (Netflix)
 Magia Record (Aniplex of America)
 Magic Knight Rayearth (Media Blasters)
 Magical Girl Lyrical Nanoha/Magical Girl Lyrical Nanoha A's (Geneon)
 Mahoromatic (Sentai Filmworks)
 Megalobox (Season 1 only) (Viz Media)
 March Comes In like a Lion (Aniplex of America)
 Mars Daybreak (Bandai Entertainment)
 The Melancholy of Haruhi Suzumiya (Bandai Entertainment -> Funimation)
 Mezzo Forte (Media Blasters)
 Mirage of Blaze (Media Blasters)
 The Misfit of Demon King Academy (Aniplex of America)
 Mob Psycho 100 (Seasons 1-2 only) (Crunchyroll)
 Mobile Suit Gundam: Iron-Blooded Orphans (Sunrise; released on home video by Funimation)
 Moribito: Guardian of the Spirit (Sentai Filmworks)
 New Getter Robo (Discotek Media)
 Nightwalker (Discotek Media)
 Ninja Cadets (Media Blasters)
 Nura: Rise of the Yokai Clan (Viz Media)
 Occultic;Nine (Aniplex of America)
 Odd Taxi (OLM/P.I.C.S./Crunchyroll)
 Omishi Magical Theater: Risky Safety (AN Entertainment)
 One-Punch Man (Viz Media)
 Otogi Zoshi (Media Blasters)
 Orient (Crunchyroll)
 Overman King Gainer (Bandai Entertainment -> Sentai Filmworks)
 Paradise Kiss (Geneon)
 Persona 4: The Animation (Sentai Filmworks)
 Le Portrait de Petit Cossette (Geneon -> Sentai Filmworks)
 Phantom the Animation (Media Blasters)
 Planetes (Bandai Entertainment)
 Please Teacher! (Bandai Entertainment -> Nozomi Entertainment)
 Please Twins! (Bandai Entertainment -> Nozomi Entertainment)
 Pretty Boy Detective Club (Aniplex of America)
 The Promised Neverland (Aniplex of America)
 Puella Magi Madoka Magica (Aniplex of America)
 Kazuhiro Fujita's Short Stories (Media Blasters)
 Record of Grancrest War (Aniplex of America)
 Resident Evil: Infinite Darkness (TMS Entertainment/Netflix)
 Re:Zero − Starting Life in Another World (Crunchyroll)
 The Rising of the Shield Hero (Crunchyroll)
 Rokka: Braves of the Six Flowers (Crunchyroll)
 Rozen Maiden (Seasons 1-2 only) (Sentai Filmworks)
 Rurouni Kenshin (Media Blasters)
 s-CRY-ed (Bandai Entertainment -> Discotek Media)
 Saiyuki Reload + Saiyuki Reload Gunlock (Discotek Media)
 Samurai Champloo (Geneon -> Funimation)
 Samurai Girl: Real Bout High School (Tokyopop)
 Samurai: Hunt for the Sword (Media Blasters)
 Scrapped Princess (Bandai Entertainment -> Funimation)
 The Seven Deadly Sins (Kodansha/Netflix)
 Sirius the Jaeger (P.A.Works./Netflix)
 Space Pirate Captain Herlock: The Endless Odyssey (Geneon)
 Squid Girl (Season 1 only) (Sentai Filmworks)
 Stellvia (Discotek Media)
 Strait Jacket (Manga Entertainment)
 Sushi Ninja (Daisuki)
 Sword Art Online (Aniplex of America)
 Sword Art Online Alternative Gun Gale Online (Aniplex of America)
 Sword Gai (LandQ Studios/DLE/Production I.G./Netflix)
 Tenjho Tenge (Discotek Media)
 The Testament of Sister New Devil (Crunchyroll)
 Thus Spoke Rohan Kishibe (David Production/Netflix)
 Tokko (Manga Entertainment)
 Tokyo 24th Ward (Aniplex of America)
 Toradora! (NIS America)
 Treasure Island (TMS Entertainment)
 Tweeny Witches (Media Blasters)
 The Twelve Kingdoms (Media Blasters)
 Vampire Knight (Viz Media)
 Vandread (Funimation)
 Vivy: Fluorite Eye's Song (Aniplex of America)
 Welcome to Demon School! Iruma-kun (Crunchyroll/Sentai Filmworks)
 When They Cry (Season 1 only) (Sentai Filmworks)
 Wild Arms: Twilight Venom (ADV Films)
 Witch Hunter Robin (Bandai Entertainment -> Funimation)
 X (Funimation)
 Yashahime: Princess Half-Demon (Viz Media; co-dubbed with Ocean Productions in Vancouver BC, Canada)
 Your Lie in April (Aniplex of America)
 Ys (Media Blasters)
 Yuki Yuna Is a Hero (Season 1 only) (Sentai Filmworks)

Animation 

 Bottersnikes and Gumbles
 Dota: Dragon's Blood 
 Gisele Bündchen and the Green Team
 Guardians of the Galaxy
 Kindi Kids
 Kung Fu Pork Choppers (CraneKahn → Kidtagious Entertainment)
 Lego Friends
 Llama Llama
 Lost in Oz
 Martha and Friends
 Marvel Rising
 Rainbow Butterfly Unicorn Kitty
 Rick and Morty
 Secret Millionaires Club
 Spider-Man (2017 TV series)
 Tennis the Good Boy
 Transformers: Combiner Wars
 Transformers: Titans Return
 Transformers: Power of the Primes
 Wacky Races
 YooHoo to the Rescue
 Young Justice: Outsiders

Films

Anime 

 5 Centimeters Per Second (Crunchyroll/Bandai Entertainment)
 Bubble (Netflix/Wit Studio)
 Cardcaptor Sakura: The Movie 2 - The Sealed Card (Geneon)
 Demon Slayer: Kimetsu no Yaiba – The Movie: Mugen Train (Aniplex of America)
 Fate/stay night: Unlimited Blade Works (2010 film) (Sentai Filmworks)
 Gamba: Gamba to Nakama-tachi (Air Bound) (Lionsgate)
 Giovanni's Island (Production I.G)
 Gundress (Media Blasters)
 Hunter × Hunter: Phantom Rouge (Viz Media)
 Hunter × Hunter: The Last Mission (Viz Media)
 Kingsglaive: Final Fantasy XV (Square Enix/Sony Pictures)
 Kite Liberator (Cinedigm)
 Kuroko's Basketball The Movie: Last Game (Production I.G/Netflix)
 Love Live! The School Idol Movie (NIS America)
 Lupin III: Jigen's Gravestone (TMS Entertainment/Discotek Media)
 Mobile Suit Gundam F91 (Bandai Entertainment)
 Ninokuni (OLM, Inc./Warner Bros. Japan/Netflix)
 Oblivion Island: Haruka and the Magic Mirror (Production I.G)
 Redline (Manga Entertainment)
 Resident Evil: Damnation (Capcom/Sony Pictures)
 Resident Evil: Vendetta (Marza/Sony Pictures)
 Sakura Wars: The Movie (Geneon)
 Stand by Me Doraemon (Fujiko Productions/Viz Media)
 Stand by Me Doraemon 2 (Toho/Netflix)
 Sword Art Online Progressive: Aria of a Starless Night (A-1 Pictures/Aniplex of America)
 Puella Magi Madoka Magica: The Movie (Aniplex of America)
 Tekken: Blood Vengeance (Bandai Entertainment)
 The Disappearance of Haruhi Suzumiya (Bandai Entertainment)
 The Laws of the Universe: Part 0 (Eleven Arts)

 Animation 
 Beyond Beyond Dive Olly Dive and the Pirate Treasure Hoodwinked Too! Hood vs. Evil Marvel Rising: Secret Warriors Lalaloopsy Girls: Welcome to L.A.L.A. Prep School Stan Lee's Mighty 7 Twinkle Toes: Lights Up New York The Adventures of Panda Warrior Arctic Adventure: On Frozen Pond Video games 

 .hack//G.U. Vol.2//Reminisce (Bandai/Bandai Namco Games)
 .hack//G.U. Vol.3//Redemption (Bandai/Bandai Namco Games)
 Ace Combat 7: Skies Unknown (Bandai Namco Games)
 Ace Combat Infinity (Bandai Namco Games)
 Age of Elements (Atari)
 Ar tonelico Qoga: Knell of Ar Ciel (NIS America)
 Atelier Ayesha: The Alchemist of Dusk (Tecmo Koei)
 Atelier Escha & Logy: Alchemists of the Dusk Sky (Tecmo Koei)
 Atelier Firis: The Alchemist and the Mysterious Journey (Tecmo Koei)
 Atelier Shallie: Alchemists of the Dusk Sea (Temco Koei)
 Atelier Sophie: The Alchemist of the Mysterious Book (Temco Koei)
 Ben 10 Alien Force: The Rise of Hex  (Konami Digital Entertainment)
 Blazing Souls Accelate (Idea Factory)
 Crimson Dragon (Microsoft Studios)
 D4: Dark Dreams Don't Die (Microsoft Studios)
 Danganronpa: Trigger Happy Havoc (NIS America)
 Danganronpa 2: Goodbye Despair (NIS America)
 Danganronpa Another Episode: Ultra Despair Girls (NIS America)
 Detective Pikachu (Nintendo/The Pokémon Company)
 Digimon All-Star Rumble (Bandai Namco Games)
 Disgaea 5: Alliance of Vengeance (NIS America)
 Earth Defense Force 2025 (D3 Publisher)
 Earthworm Jim (Sega)
 Eureka Seven vol.1: New Wave (Bandai/Bandai Namco Games)
 Eureka Seven vol. 2: The New Vision (Bandai/Bandai Namco Games)
 Fairy Fencer F (NIS America)
 Friday the 13th: The Game (Gun Media)
 Gods Eater Burst (D3 Publisher)
 Growlanser Generations (Working Designs)
 Hyperdimension Neptunia series (Idea Factory)
 IGPX (Bandai/Bandai Namco Games)
 Inazuma Eleven (Level-5)
 Killer Instinct (Microsoft Studios)
 King's Quest (Sierra Entertainment)
 League of Legends (Riot Games)
 LittleBigPlanet Karting (Sony Computer Entertainment)
 Magna Carta 2 (Bandai Namco Games)
 Majin and the Forsaken Kingdom (Bandai Namco Games)
 Mugen Souls Z (NIS America)
 Oreca Battle (Konami)
 Pac-Man and the Ghostly Adventures (Bandai Namco Games)
 Power Rangers Super Megaforce (Bandai Namco Games)
 Rocket Knight (localization only) (Konami)
 Rune Factory Frontier (XSEED Games/Marvelous USA)
 Rune Factory 4 (XSEED Games/Marvelous USA)
 Sakura Wars: So Long, My Love (NIS America)
 Samurai Champloo: Sidetracked (Bandai/Bandai Namco Games)
 Section 8 (SouthPeak Games)
 Sly Cooper: Thieves in Time (Sony Computer Entertainment)
 StarCraft II: Wings of Liberty (Blizzard Entertainment)
 Stargate SG-1: Unleashed (MGM Interactive)
 Summon Night 6: Lost Borders (Bandai Namco Games)
 The Amazing Spider-Man 2 (Activision)
 The Unfinished Swan (Sony Computer Entertainment)
 The Witch and the Hundred Knight (NIS America)
 Time and Eternity (NIS America)
 The Legend of Heroes: Trails in the Sky (XSEED Games)
 Trinity Universe (NIS America)
 World of Warcraft: Legion (Blizzard Entertainment)
 X-Men (Konami)

 Live-action dubbing 

 Alive (Media Blasters)
 Apokalips X (Action Slate Releasing)
 Attack the Gas Station (Media Blasters)
 Bio Zombie (Media Blasters)
 Blowback: Love & Death (Central Park Media)
 Chingu 2 (CJ Entertainment)
 Danger Dolls (Action Slate Releasing)
 Death Kappa (Media Blasters)
 Dead Sushi (Action Slate Releasing)
 Death Trance (Media Blasters)
 Fists of Legend (CJ Entertainment)
 Flu (CJ Entertainment)
 Friend 2: The Legacy (CJ Entertainment)
 JU-ON: Origins (Netflix)
 The Ladies' Phone Club (Central Park Media)
 Little Sister (Miramax)
 Love Alarm (Netflix)
 Masquerade (CJ Entertainment)
 The Mysterians (Media Blasters)
 The Neighbor No. 13 (Media Blasters)
 Nowhere Man (Netflix)
 One Missed Call (Media Blasters)
 Operation Chromite (CJ Entertainment)
 Reborn from Hell series (Media Blasters)
 Sky High (Media Blasters)
 The Son (Netflix)
 Sumo Vixens (Central Park Media)
 Terminatrix (Central Park Media)
 Tokyo Decameron (Central Park Media)
 Tokyo Mafia series (Central Park Media)
 Tokyo Zombie (Manga Entertainment)
 The Age of Shadows (CJ Entertainment)
 The Tower (CJ Entertainment)
 The Tree of Blood (Netflix)
 Versus (Media Blasters)
 Weather Woman (Central Park Media)
 Yohan: The Child Wanderer (Penelope Films)
 Zeiram 2 (Media Blasters)
 Zero Woman (Media Blasters)
 Zero Woman: Assassin Lovers (Central Park Media)

 Post-Production Sound Services 

 Black Lightning (TV Series) Gleason Legends of Tomorrow NCIS: New Orleans Scorpion (TV Series) (Seasons 1-2)
 Supergirl (TV Series) The Flash (2014 TV Series)''

Recent years 
On April 26, 2010, Bang Zoom! Entertainment CEO Eric P. Sherman sent an open letter to anime fans via blog GoAnimeTV. In the letter, he stated that the company will most likely stop producing English dubs of anime titles in 2011 if the industry does not start showing improvement. He cited the fansubbing and unlicensed copying of anime content as the primary reason for Geneon Entertainment USA, Urban Vision, Central Park Media, Tokyopop, and ADV Films closing their doors, as well as the January 2009 layoffs at Bandai Entertainment. Sherman also emphasized in the article that "anime is going to die" if fans do not start buying more content from the studios that license shows for distribution.

References

External links 

 
 

Anime companies
Companies based in Burbank, California
Dubbing studios
Mass media companies established in 1993
Recording studios in California